General elections were held in Kuwait on 29 September 2022 following the dissolution of parliament by Crown Prince Mishal Al-Ahmad Al-Jaber Al-Sabah. The election result was annulled by Kuwait's Constitutional Court on March 19, 2023.

Background 
On 22 June Crown Prince Sheikh Mishal Al-Ahmad Al-Jaber Al-Sabah announced the dissolution of Parliament. On 28 August, the Kuwaiti Cabinet approved the decree calling for elections on 29 September.

Electoral system 
The 50 elected members of the National Assembly are elected from five 10-seat constituencies by single non-transferable vote. Political parties are not officially licensed, therefore candidates run as individuals, although many political groups operate freely as de facto political parties. All Kuwaiti citizens (both male and female) above the age of 21 have the right to vote.

Candidates
Registration of candidates contesting the 50 seats took place between 29 August and 7 September 2022. 118 schools were used for the 2022 National Assembly elections on 29 September. A total of 305 candidates, including 22 women, were registered.

While the previous elections in 2020 were affected by anti-coronavirus measures, this time candidates were able to open electoral offices and hold live hustings. Security services stepped up their monitoring of vote buying.

Results
Opposition politicians were reported to have made significant gains. Islamists, including many affiliated with the Muslim Brotherhood, established themselves in parliament, while Shi’ites displaced palace-aligned Sunni candidates. Many reformist candidates, including two women, also won seats.

Elected members

Aftermath

On March 19, 2023, Kuwait's constitutional court ruled  in favor of reinstating the previous parliament elected in 2020, as they cited discrepancies in the decree dissolving the previous parliament as the reason behind the verdict.

References

Kuwait
General election
Elections in Kuwait
Non-partisan elections